The  Kansas City Brigade season was the second season for the arena football franchise. They made the playoffs for the first time in franchise history, going 10–6 as compared to the 3–13 record in 2006. However, they lost in the first round of the playoffs to the Colorado Crush 49–42.

Regular season schedule

Playoffs

Coaching
Kevin Porter started his second season as head coach of the Brigade.

Stats

Offense

Passing

Rushing

Receiving

Touchdowns

Defense

Special teams

Kick return

Kicking

Playoff Stats

Offense

Passing

Rushing

Receiving

Defense

Special teams

Kick return

Kicking

Regular season

Week 1: vs Chicago Rush

at Kemper Arena, Kansas City, Missouri
 Game time: March 4, 2007 at 11:30 AM CST
 Game attendance: 13,600
 Officials: Bill Lemonnier, Mike Delaney, Allen Baynes, Dana McKinzie, Billy Beckett
 Offensive Player of the Game: Charles Frederick (KC)
 Defensive Player of the Game: Kenny McEntyre (KC)

Scoring Summary:

1st Quarter:
11:42 CHI – 18 yd TD Pass to Sippio from D`Orazio (Failed PAT) – 6–0 CHI
07:21 KC – 1 yd TD Run by Philyaw (PAT by Rush) – 7–6 KC
02:07 CHI – 24 yd Interception Return TD by Alfonzo (PAT by Frantz) – 13–7 CHI

2nd Quarter:
12:11 KC – 5 yd TD Pass to Myers from Philyaw (PAT by Rush) – 14–13 KC
11:29 KC – Safety – 16–13 KC
06:41 KC – 11 yd TD Pass to Myers from Philyaw (PAT by Rush) – 23–13 KC
01:10 CHI – 2 yd TD Pass to Sippio from D`Orazio (Failed PAT by Frantz) – 23–19 KC

3rd Quarter:
13:03 KC – 9 yd TD Run by Frederick (Failed PAT by Rush) – 29–19 KC
08:42 CHI – 20 yd TD Pass to Sippio from D`Orazio (PAT by Frantz) – 29–26 KC
03:52 KC – 3 yd TD Run by Moss (Failed PAT by Rush) – 35–26 KC

4th Quarter:
14:11 KC – 5 yd TD Run by Frederick (Failed Rush Attempt by Bishop) – 41–26 KC
14:11 CHI – PAT Return by Robinson – 41–28 KC
09:01 CHI – 2 yd TD Pass to Sippio from D`Orazio (PAT by Frantz) – 41–35 KC
01:44 KC – 6 yd TD Run by Philyaw PAT by Rush) – 48–35 KC
00:30 KC – 27 yd TD Run by Frederick (Failed PAT by Rush) – 54–35 KC
00:00 CHI – 31 yd TD Pass to Sippio from D`Orazio (Failed PAT by Frantz) – 54–41 KC

Week 2: at Colorado Crush

at Pepsi Center, Denver, Colorado
 Game time: March 10, 2007 at 7:10 PM MST
 Game attendance: 15,126
 Officials: Barry Anderson, Rick Lowe, Brent Durbin, Art Lucky, Scott Helverson, Dave Einspahr
 Offensive Player of the Game: Willie Quinnie (COL)
 Defensive Player of the Game: Anthony Dunn (COL)
 Ironman of the Game: Robert Thomas (COL)

Scoring Summary:

1st Quarter:
09:28 COL – 21 yd FG by Ball – 3–0 COL
06:33 KC – 6 yd TD Run by Myers (PAT by Rush) – 7–3 KC

2nd Quarter:
14:17 COL – 5 yd TD Pass to Harrell from Dutton (PAT by Ball) – 10–7 COL
06:31 COL – 7 yd TD Pass to Quinnie from Dutton (PAT by Ball) – 17–7 COL
00:10 KC – 6 yd TD Pass to Frederick from Philyaw (PAT by Rush) – 17–14 COL
00:00 COL – 38 yd FG by Ball – 20–14 COL

3rd Quarter:
10:12 KC – 4 yd TD Pass to Myers from Philyaw (Failed PAT by Ball) – 20–20
07:01 COL – 1 yd TD Run by Thomas (PAT by Ball) – 27–20 COL
03:30 KC – 7 yd TD Pass to Brown from Philyaw (PAT by Rush) – 27–27

4th Quarter:
14:20 COL – 13 yd TD Pass to Quinnie from Dutton (PAT by Ball) – 34–27 COL
06:31 COL – 22 yd FG by Ball – 37–27 COL
02:39 KC – 11 yd TD Pass to Frederick from Philyaw (PAT by Rush) – 37–34 COL
00:56 COL – 10 yd TD Pass to Harrell from Dutton (PAT by Ball) – 44–34 COL
00:27 KC – 24 yd TD Pass to Myers from Philyaw (Failed PAT by Rush) – 44–40 COL

Week 3: vs Dallas Desperados

at Kemper Arena, Kansas City, Missouri
 Game time: March 16, 2007 at 7:00 PM CDT
 Game attendance: 10,007
 Officials: Dave Cutaia, Doug Wilson, Greg Shields, Dave Chesney, James Cole
 Offensive Player of the Game: Josh White (DAL)
 Defensive Player of the Game: DaShane Dennis (KC)
 Ironman of the Game: Will Pettis (DAL)

Scoring Summary:

1st Quarter:
09:25 DAL – 2 yd TD Run by White (PAT by Sievers) – 7–0 DAL
03:42 DAL – 4 yd TD Run by White (PAT by Sievers) – 14–0 DAL
01:15 KC – 6 yd TD Run by Frederick (PAT by Rush) – 14–7 DAL

2nd Quarter:
14:16 DAL – 3 yd TD Run by Nash (PAT by Sievers) – 21–7 DAL
08:00 KC – 9 yd TD Pass to Simmons from Philyaw (PAT by Rush) – 21–14 DAL
03:20 DAL – 28 yd TD Pass to Nash from Dolezel (PAT by Sievers) – 28–14 DAL
00:46 KC – 3 yd TD Run by Frederick (PAT by Rush) – 28–21 DAL
00:00 DAL – 16 yd FG by Sievers – 31–21 DAL

3rd Quarter:
10:50 KC – 3 yd TD Run by Frederick (Failed PAT by Rush) – 31–27 DAL
07:02 DAL – 1 yd TD Run by White (PAT by Sievers) – 38–27 DAL
03:59 KC – 24 yd TD Pass to Frederick from Davis (PAT by Rush) – 38–34 DAL
00:28 DAL – 1 yd TD Run by White (PAT by Sievers) – 45–34 DAL

4th Quarter:
09:53 DAL – 10 yd TD Pass to Nash from Dolezel (PAT by Sievers) – 52–34 DAL
05:49 KC – 2 yd TD Pass to Frederick from Philyaw (PAT by Rush) – 52–41 DAL
04:40 DAL – 8 yd TD Run by White (PAT by Sievers) – 59–41 DAL
02:39 KC – 30 yd TD Pass to Simmons from Philyaw (PAT by Rush) – 59–48 DAL
01:15 DAL – 4 yd TD Pass to Marshall from Dolezel (PAT by Sievers) – 66–48 DAL
00:44 KC – 0 yd Fumble Recovery TD by Cohen (Failed Pass Attempt from Philyaw) – 66–54 DAL

Week 5: vs Arizona Rattlers

at Kemper Arena, Kansas City, Missouri
 Game time: March 30, 2007 at 7:00 PM CDT
 Game attendance: 8,512
 Officials: Dave Lambros, Al Granado, Mike McCabe, Brian Matthew, Joe Duncan
 Offensive Player of the Game: Raymond Philyaw (KC)
 Defensive Player of the Game: Denario Smalls (KC)
 Ironman of the Game: Charles Frederick (KC)

Scoring Summary:

1st Quarter:
09:41 – ARI – 5 yd TD Pass to Harvey from Bonner (PAT by Kral) – 7–0 ARI
06:45 – KC – 19 yd TD Pass to Myers from Philyaw (Failed PAT by Rush) – 7–6 ARI
02:48 – ARI – 2 yd TD Run by Kelly (PAT by Kral) – 14–6 ARI
00:29 – KC – 19 yd TD Pass to Frederick from Philyaw (PAT by Rush) – 14–13 ARI

2nd Quarter:
11:53 – ARI – 2 yd TD Run by Kelly (Failed PAT by Kral) – 20–13 ARI
06:07 – ARI – 42 yd TD Pass to Harvey from Bonner (PAT by Kral) – 27–13 ARI

3rd Quarter:
13:56 – KC – 8 yd Fumble Recovery TD by Douzart (PAT by Rush) – 27–20 ARI
07:42 – ARI – 2 yd TD Pass to McKenzie from Bonner (PAT by Kral) – 34–20 ARI
04:10 – ARI – 16 yd TD Pass to Pope from Bonner (PAT by Kral) – 41–20 ARI
01:40 – KC – 32 yd TD Pass to Myers from Philyaw (PAT by Rush) – 41–27 ARI

4th Quarter:
14:23 – KC – 1 yd TD Run by Frederick (PAT by Rush) – 41–34 ARI
13:17 – KC – 42 yd Interception Return TD by Smalls (PAT by Rush) – 41–41
09:51 – ARI – 5 yd TD Pass to Harvey from Bonner (Failed PAT by Kral) – 47–41 ARI
05:08 – KC – 1 yd TD Run by Philyaw (PAT by Rush) – 48–47 KC
00:35 – KC – 18 yd TD Pass to Williams from Philyaw (PAT by Rush) – 55–47 KC
00:05 – ARI – 20 yd TD Pass to Harvey from Bonner (Pass Attempt to Pope from Kral) – 55–55

Overtime:
14:26 – KC – 35 yd TD Pass to Williams from Philyaw (PAT by Rush) – 62–55 KC
12:20 – ARI – 31 yd TD Pass to McKenzie from Bonner (Failed Pass Attempt from Kral) – 62–61 KC

Week 6: at Las Vegas Gladiators

at Orleans Arena, Las Vegas, Nevada
 Game time: April 8, 2007 at 3:05 PM PDT
 Game attendance: 4,838
 Officials: Tom McCabe, Paul Frerking, Rod Pearson, Bob McElwee, Tony Lombardo
 Offensive Player of the Game: Raymond Philyaw (KC)
 Defensive Player of the Game: B.J. Cohen (KC)
 Ironman of the Game: Ira Gooch (KC)

Scoring Summary:

1st Quarter:
12:17 – LV – 39 yd FG by Azar – 3–0 LV
10:59 – KC – 13 yd TD Pass to Frederick from Philyaw (PAT by Rush) – 7–3 KC
07:16 – KC – 23 yd TD Pass to Gooch from Philyaw (PAT by Rush) – 14–3 KC
00:36 – KC – 42 yd TD Pass to Frederick from Philyaw (Failed PAT by Rush) – 20–3 KC

2nd Quarter:
14:25 – KC – 2 yd TD Run by Moss (PAT by Rush) – 27–3 KC
11:33 – KC – 38 yd TD Pass to Myers from Philyaw (PAT by Rush) – 34–3 KC
09:01 – LV – 39 yd TD Pass to Quattlebaum from King (PAT by Azar) – 34–10 KC
04:32 – KC – 18 yd TD Pass to Frederick from Philyaw (PAT by Rush) – 41–10 KC
00:25 – LV – 6 yd TD Pass to Quattlebaum from King (PAT by Azar) – 41–17 KC

3rd Quarter:
12:05 – KC – 1 yd TD Run by Frederick (PAT by Rush) – 48–17 KC
08:30 – LV – 5 yd TD Pass to Quattlebaum from King (PAT by Azar) – 48–24 KC
04:11 – KC – 29 yd TD Pass to Gooch from Philyaw (PAT by Rush) – 55–24 KC
01:35 – KC – 28 yd Interception Return TD by McEntyre (PAT by Rush) – 62–24 KC

4th Quarter:
06:20 – LV – 1 yd TD Run by Rue (PAT by Azar) – 62–31 KC
02:00 – KC – 28 yd FG by Rush – 65–31 KC

Week 7: vs Grand Rapids Rampage

at Kemper Arena, Kansas City, Missouri
 Game time: April 14, 2007 at 7:00 PM CDT
 Game attendance: 11,288
 Officials: Riley Johnson, Wes Fritz, Neil Brunner, Paul Engelbets, Bud McCleskey
 Offensive Player of the Game: Raymond Philyaw (KC)
 Defensive Player of the Game: Isaiah Trufant (KC)
 Ironman of the Game: Timon Marshall (GR)

Scoring Summary:

1st Quarter:
10:54 – KC – 9 yd TD Pass to Williams from Philyaw (Failed Rush Attempt by Rush) – 6–0 KC
07:19 – KC – 9 yd TD Pass to Williams from Philyaw (PAT by Rush) – 13–0 KC
04:01 – GR – 9 yd TD Pass to Marshall from Salisbury (PAT by Gowins) – 13–7 KC
02:03 – KC – 31 yd TD Pass to Gooch from Philyaw (PAT by Rush) – 20–7 KC

2nd Quarter:
10:34 – GR – 1 yd TD Run by Ryan (Failed PAT by Gowins) – 20–13 KC
10:34 – KC – PAT Return by McEntyre – 22–13 KC
09:17 – KC – 30 yd TD Pass to Williams from Philyaw (PAT by Rush) – 29–13 KC
05:30 – GR – 3 yd TD Run by Ryan (Failed PAT by Gowins) – 29–19 KC
00:24 – KC – 1 yd TD Run by Williams (PAT by Rush) – 36–19 KC
00:15 – GR – 51 yd Kickoff Return TD by Marshall (PAT by Gowins) – 36–26 KC

3rd Quarter:
14:24 – GR – 18 yd TD Pass to Anderson from Salisbury (PAT by Gowins) – 36–33 KC
06:25 – KC – 8 yd TD Pass to Moore from Philyaw (Failed PAT by Rush) – 42–33 KC

4th Quarter:
11:42 – KC – 12 yd TD Pass to Gooch from Philyaw (PAT by Rush) – 49–33 KC
06:07 – GR – 15 yd TD Pass to Anderson from Salisbury (Pass Attempt to McGill from Salisbury) – 49–41 KC
02:46 – KC – 24 yd FG by Rush – 52–41 KC

Week 8: at Nashville Kats

at Sommet Center, Nashville, Tennessee
 Game time: April 21, 2007 at 7:00 PM CDT
 Game attendance: 8,143
 Officials: Barry Anderson, Rick Lowe, Brent Durbin, Art Lucky, Scott Helverson, Jim Lowery
 Offensive Player of the Game: Dan Alexander (NAS)
 Defensive Player of the Game: Ahmad Hawkins (NAS)
 Ironman of the Game: Maurice Brown (NAS)

Scoring Summary:

1st Quarter:
08:36 – NAS – 3 yd TD Run by Alexander (PAT by Witczak) – 7–0 NAS
04:44 – KC – 10 yd TD Pass to Williams from Philyaw (PAT by Rush) – 7–7

2nd Quarter:
14:56 – NAS – 11 yd TD Run by Alexander (PAT by Witczak) – 14–7 NAS
11:53 – NAS – 1 yd TD Run by Alexander (PAT by Witczak) – 21–7 NAS
08:27 – KC – 2 yd TD Run by Frederick (PAT by Rush) – 21–14 NAS
03:20 – NAS – 3 yd TD Run by Alexander (PAT by Witczak) – 28–14 NAS
00:15 – KC – 5 yd TD Pass to Myers from Philyaw (PAT by Rush) – 28–21 NAS

3rd Quarter:
11:54 – KC – 3 yd TD Pass to Myers from Philyaw (PAT by Rush) – 28–28
10:15 – NAS – 18 yd TD Run by Alexander (PAT by Witczak) – 35–28 NAS
05:17 – KC – 7 yd TD Pass to Myers from Philyaw (Failed PAT by Rush) – 35–34 NAS
03:27 – NAS – 7 yd TD Pass to Higgins from Smoker (PAT by Witczak) – 42–34 NAS

4th Quarter:
11:07 – KC – 19 yd TD Pass to Myers from Philyaw (Failed PAT by Rush) – 42–40 NAS
04:17 – NAS – 1 yd TD Run by Alexander (PAT by Witczak) – 49–40 NAS

Week 9: vs Colorado Crush

at Kemper Arena, Kansas City, Missouri
 Game time: April 27, 2007 at 7:00 PM CDT
 Game attendance: 11,246
 Officials: Steve Pamon, Rick Podraza, Julian Mapp, R.G. Detillier, Reggie Smith
 Offensive Player of the Game: John Dutton (COL)
 Defensive Player of the Game: Rashad Floyd (COL)
 Ironman of the Game: Charles Frederick (KC)

Scoring Summary:

1st Quarter:
12:30 – COL – 24 yd TD Pass to Harrell from Dutton (PAT by Ball) – 7–0 COL
08:06 – KC – 2 yd TD Run by Moss (PAT by Rush) – 7–7
02:00 – COL – 11 yd TD Pass to Harrell from Dutton (PAT by Ball) – 14–7 COL

2nd Quarter:
13:57 – KC – 5 yd TD Pass to Frederick from Philyaw (PAT by Rush) – 14–14
04:33 – COL – 7 yd TD Pass to Harrell from Dutton (PAT by Ball) – 21–14 COL
00:51 – KC – 1 yd TD Run by Moss (PAT by Rush) – 21–21
00:06 – COL – 32 yd FG by Ball – 24–21 COL

3rd Quarter:
12:08 – KC – 5 yd TD Run by Moss (PAT by Rush) – 28–24 KC
08:12 – COL – 10 yd TD Pass to Nix from Dutton (PAT by Ball) – 31–28 COL

4th Quarter:
12:33 – COL – 1 yd TD Run by Harmon (PAT by Ball) – 38–28 COL
02:57 – KC – 7 yd TD Pass to Williams from Philyaw (PAT by Rush) – 38–35 COL
01:26 – COL – 39 yd TD Pass to Pyatt from Dutton (PAT by Ball) – 45–35 COL
00:17 – KC – 10 yd TD Pass to Williams from Philyaw (PAT by Rush) – 45–42 COL

Week 10: at Philadelphia Soul

at Wachovia Center, Philadelphia, Pennsylvania
 Game time: May 5, 2007 at 7:00 PM EDT
 Game attendance: 17,493
 Officials: Steven Parnon, Wes Fritz, Neil Brunner, Paul Engelberts, Reggie Smith, Ron Pollack
 Offensive Player of the Game: Raymond Philyaw (KC)
 Defensive Player of the Game: Nick Ward (KC)
 Ironman of the Game: Charles Pauley (PHI)

Scoring Summary:

1st Quarter:
11:04 – KC – 7 yd TD Pass to Williams from Philyaw (PAT by Rush) – 7–0 KC
09:27 – PHI – 10 yd TD Run by Wood (Failed PAT by France) – 7–6 KC
05:42 – KC – 1 yd TD Run by Frederick (PAT by Rush) – 14–6 KC

2nd Quarter:
12:04 – PHI – 40 yd TD Pass to Pauley from Wood (PAT by France) – 14–13 KC
09:02 – KC – 17 yd TD Pass to Frederick from Philyaw (Failed PAT by Rush) – 20–13 KC
06:09 – PHI – 22 yd TD Pass to Pauley from Wood (PAT by France) – 20–20
01:39 – KC – 4 yd TD Pass to Myers from Philyaw (PAT by Rush) – 27–20 KC
00:03 – KC – 9 yd TD Pass to Frederick from Philyaw (Failed PAT by Rush) – 33–20 KC

3rd Quarter:
03:43 – PHI – 24 yd TD Pass to McKelvey from Wood (PAT by France) – 33–27 KC

4th Quarter:
14:57 – KC – 1 yd TD Run by Frederick (Failed PAT by Rush) – 39–27 KC
11:57 – PHI – 5 yd TD Pass to James from Wood (PAT by France) – 39–34 KC
09:41 – KC – 15 yd TD Pass to Williams from Philyaw (PAT by Rush) – 46–34 KC
05:39 – PHI – 8 yd TD Pass to McKelvey from Wood (PAT by France) – 46–41 KC
00:52 – KC – 7 yd TD Pass to Williams from Philyaw (PAT by Rush) – 53–31 KC

Week 11: vs Utah Blaze

at Kemper Arena, Kansas City, Missouri
 Game time: May 12, 2007 at 7:00 PM CDT
 Game attendance: 13,655
 Officials: Perry Havener, Tom Laverty, Bill Ward, David Meslow, Jim DeBell
 Offensive Player of the Game: Raymond Philyaw (KC)
 Defensive Player of the Game: Nick Ward (KC)
 Ironman of the Game: Boo Williams (KC)

Scoring Summary:

1st Quarter:
12:17 – KC – 12 yd TD Pass to Williams from Philyaw (PAT by Kral) – 7–0 KC
07:47 – UTA – 4 yd TD Run by Pace (PAT by Videtich) – 7–7
05:53 – KC – 10 yd TD Pass to Frederick from Philyaw (PAT by Kral) – 14–7 KC

2nd Quarter:
14:14 – KC – 28 yd TD Pass to Hines from Philyaw (Failed PAT by Kral) – 20–7 KC
11:13 – KC – 26 yd TD Pass to Hines from Philyaw (Failed Rush Attempt by Kral) – 26–7 KC
01:00 – KC – 6 yd TD Pass to Williams from Philyaw (PAT by Kral) – 33–7 KC
00:00 – KC – 12 yd TD Pass to Williams from Philyaw (PAT by Kral) – 40–7 KC

3rd Quarter:
10:36 – UTA – 8 yd TD Pass to Burley from Germaine (Failed PAT by Videtich) – 40–13 KC
09:08 – KC – 9 yd TD Pass to Frederick from Philyaw (PAT by Kral) – 47–13 KC
03:48 – UTA – 5 yd TD Pass to Skaggs from Germaine (PAT by Videtich) – 47–20 KC
01:43 – KC – 7 yd TD Run by Frederick (PAT by Kral) – 54–20 KC
00:30 – UTA – 30 yd TD Pass to Burley from Germaine (PAT by Videtich) – 54–27 KC

4th Quarter:
06:07 – KC – 18 yd TD Pass to Myers from Philyaw (Failed PAT by Kral) – 60–27 KC
03:38 – UTA – 8 yd TD Pass to Pace from Germaine (PAT by Videtich) – 60–34 KC
00:48 – UTA – 8 yd TD Pass to Burley from Germaine (PAT by Videtich) – 60–41 KC

Week 12: at New York Dragons

at Nassau Veterans Memorial Coliseum, Uniondale, New York
 Game time: May 20, 2007 at 1:05 PM EDT
 Game attendance: 8,798
 Officials: Dave Lambros, Paul King, Wayne Mackie, Brian Matthew, Joe Duncan, Robert Benson
 Offensive Player of the Game: Aaron Garcia (NYD), Josh Shaw (NYD)
 Defensive Player of the Game: Will Holder (NYD)
 Ironman of the Game: DaShane Dennis (NYD)

Scoring Summary:

1st Quarter:
13:10 – NYD – 21 yd TD Pass to Willis from Garcia (PAT by Warley) – 7–0 NYD
11:46 – KC – 18 yd TD Pass to Frederick from Philyaw (PAT by Kral) – 7–7
10:39 – NYD – 40 yd TD Pass to Swayne from Garcia (PAT by Warley) – 14–7 NYD
07:01 – KC – 8 yd TD Pass to Frederick from Philyaw (PAT by Kral) – 14–14
02:12 – NYD – 3 yd TD Pass to Willis from Garcia (PAT by Warley) – 21–14 NYD

2nd Quarter:
14:56 – KC – 11 yd TD Pass to Frederick from Philyaw (PAT by Kral) – 21–21
12:11 – NYD – 18 yd TD Pass to Swayne from Garcia (PAT by Warley) – 28–21 NYD
10:08 – KC – 24 yd TD Pass to Frederick from Philyaw (PAT by Kral) – 28–28
05:38 – NYD – 4 yd TD Pass to Horacek from Garcia (PAT by Warley) – 35–28 NYD
00:13 – NYD – 4 yd TD Pass to Swayne from Garcia (PAT by Warley) – 42–28 NYD

3rd Quarter:
12:53 – NYD – 5 yd TD Pass to Swayne from Garcia (Failed PAT by Warley) – 48–28 NYD
06:15 – KC – 16 yd TD Pass to Frederick from Philyaw (PAT by Kral) – 48–35 NYD
05:12 – NYD – 8 yd TD Pass to Swayne from Garcia (PAT by Warley) – 55–35 NYD

4th Quarter:
10:46 – KC – 33 yd TD Pass to Myers from Philyaw (PAT by Kral) – 55–42 NYD
09:00 – NYD – 7 yd TD Pass to Hall from Garcia (PAT by Warley) – 62–42 NYD
05:12 – KC – 7 yd TD Pass to Myers from Philyaw (PAT by Kral) – 62–49 NYD
00:50 – KC – 27 yd TD Pass to Williams from Philyaw (PAT by Kral) – 62–56 NYD

Week 13: vs Los Angeles Avengers

at Kemper Arena, Kansas City, Missouri
 Game time: May 26, 2007 at 5:00 PM CDT
 Game attendance: 13,213
 Officials: Barry Anderson, Rick Lowe, Kelly Saalfeld, Art Lucky, Scott Heiverson
 Offensive Player of the Game: Charles Frederick (KC)
 Defensive Player of the Game: Travis Coleman (KC)
 Ironman of the Game: Boo Williams (KC)

Scoring Summary:

1st Quarter:
12:52 – KC – 12 yd TD Pass to Williams from Philyaw (PAT by Kral) – 7–0 KC
09:32 – LA – 1 yd TD Run by Ford (PAT by Hamilton) – 7–7
07:30 – KC – 8 yd TD Pass to Williams from Philyaw (PAT by Kral) – 14–7 KC
03:39 – LA – 9 yd TD Pass to Stubbs from Cumbie (PAT by Hamilton) – 14–14

2nd Quarter:
09:03 – KC – 6 yd TD Pass to Frederick from Philyaw (PAT by Kral) – 21–14 KC
02:34 – KC – 9 yd TD Pass to Frederick from Philyaw (PAT by Kral) – 28–14 KC
00:00 – KC – 1 yd TD Run by Moss (Failed PAT by Kral) – 34–14 KC

3rd Quarter:
10:09 – LA – 18 yd TD Pass to Turner from Cumbie (PAT by Hamilton) – 34–21 KC
04:57 – LA – 2 yd TD Run by Ford (PAT by Hamilton) – 34–28 KC
02:41 – KC – 5 yd TD Pass to Frederick from Philyaw (PAT by Kral) – 41–28 KC
01:21 – LA – 47 yd TD Pass to Flowers from Cumbie (PAT by Hamilton) – 41–35 KC

4th Quarter:
12:58 – KC – 1 yd TD Run by Philyaw (PAT by Kral) – 48–35 KC
11:40 – KC – 18 yd Interception Return TD by Coleman (PAT by Kral) – 55–35 KC
02:02 – LA – 31 yd TD Pass to Ward from Cumbie (PAT by Hamilton) – 55–42 KC
00:58 – KC – 11 yd TD Run by Moss (PAT by Kral) – 62–42 KC
00:32 – LA – 3 yd TD Pass to Turner from Cumbie (PAT by Hamilton) – 62–49 KC
00:05 – LA – 9 yd TD Pass to Turner from Cumbie (PAT by Hamilton) – 62–56 KC

Week 14: at Grand Rapids Rampage

at Van Andel Arena, Grand Rapids, Michigan
 Game time: June 2, 2007 at 7:00 PM EDT
 Game attendance: 5,074
 Officials: Bill LeMonnier, Mike Delaney, Allen Baynes, Dana McKenzie, Billie Beckett
 Offensive Player of the Game: Raymond Philyaw (KC)
 Defensive Player of the Game: Bryan Henderson (GR)
 Ironman of the Game: Charles Frederick (KC)

Scoring Summary:

1st Quarter:
13:46 – GR – 11 yd TD Pass to Marshall from Salisbury (PAT by Gowins) – 7–0 GR
11:14 – GR – 2 yd TD Run by Ryan (PAT by Gowins) – 14–0 GR
07:35 – KC – 13 yd TD Pass to Frederick from Philyaw (PAT by Kral) – 14–7 GR
03:23 – GR – 42 yd FG by Gowins – 17–7 GR

2nd Quarter:
14:56 – KC – 17 yd TD Run by Moss (PAT by Kral) – 17–14 GR
13:06 – GR – 29 yd TD Pass to Marshall from Salisbury (PAT by Gowins) – 24–14 GR
02:40 – GR – 1 yd TD Run by Ryan (Failed PAT by Gowins) – 30–14 GR
00:28 – KC – 21 yd TD Pass to Hines from Philyaw (PAT by Kral) – 30–21 GR
00:02 – GR – 17 yd TD Pass to Bonner from Salisbury (PAT by Gowins) – 37–21 GR

3rd Quarter:
11:34 – KC – 2 yd TD Pass to Moss from Philyaw (Failed PAT by Kral) – 37–27 GR
08:00 – GR – 8 yd TD Pass to Marshall from Salisbury (Failed PAT by Gowins) – 43–27 GR
03:24 – KC – 7 yd TD Pass to Frederick from Philyaw (Failed PAT by Kral) – 43–33 GR

4th Quarter:
14:56 – GR – 20 yd FG by Gowins – 46–33 GR
13:15 – KC – 26 yd TD Pass to Hines from Philyaw (Rush Attempt by Philyaw) – 46–41 GR
10:15 – KC – 18 yd TD Pass to Myers from Philyaw (Failed PAT by Kral) – 47–46 KC
07:27 – KC – 30 yd Interception Return TD by McEntyre (Failed PAT by Kral) – 53–46 KC
02:16 – KC – 28 yd TD Pass to Frederick from Philyaw (Failed PAT by Kral) – 59–46 KC
00:41 – GR – 5 yd TD Run by McPherson (PAT by Gowins) – 59–53 KC
00:17 – KC – 1 yd TD Pass to Hines from Philyaw (PAT by Kral) – 66–53 KC

Week 15: at Columbus Destroyers

at Nationwide Arena, Columbus, Ohio
 Game time: June 8, 2007 at 7:08 PM EDT
 Game attendance: 13,803
 Officials: Steve Pamon, Wes Fritz, Neil Brunner, Paul Engelberts, Reggie Smith, Paul Hummel
 Offensive Player of the Game: Raymond Philyaw (KC)
 Defensive Player of the Game: Travis Coleman (KC)
 Ironman of the Game: B.J. Cohen (KC)

Scoring Summary:

1st Quarter:
00:47 – CLB – 3 yd TD Pass to Knight from Nagy (Failed PAT by Martinez) – 6–0 CLB

2nd Quarter:
14:49 – KC – 30 yd TD Pass to Myers from Philyaw (Failed PAT by Kral) – 6–6
10:33 – KC – 16 yd TD Pass to Myers from Philyaw (PAT by Kral) – 13–6 KC
06:23 – CLB – 3 yd TD Run by Wells (PAT by Martinez) – 13–13
04:26 – KC – 32 yd TD Pass to Gooch from Philyaw (PAT by Kral) – 20–13 KC
00:17 – KC – 14 yd TD Pass to Frederick from Philyaw (PAT by Kral) – 27–13 KC

3rd Quarter:
02:14 – KC – 8 yd TD Pass to Hines from Philyaw (PAT by Kral) – 34–13 KC

4th Quarter:
14:56 – CLB – 1 yd TD Run by Wells (PAT by Martinez) – 34–20 KC
12:32 – KC – 5 yd TD Pass to Frederick from Philyaw (PAT by Kral) – 41–20 KC
05:25 – CLB – 3 yd TD Pass to Solomon from Nagy (Pass Attempt to Saunders from Nagy) – 41–28 KC
03:25 – KC – 13 yd TD Pass to Ward from Philyaw (Failed Pass Attempt from Davis) – 47–28 KC
00:30 – CLB – 14 yd TD Pass to Solomon from Nagy (Failed PAT by Nagy) – 47–34

Week 16: vs Nashville Kats

at Kemper Arena, Kansas City, Missouri
 Game time: June 16, 2007 at 7:08 PM CDT
 Game attendance: 13,596
 Officials: Tom McCabe, Paul Frerking, Rod Pearson, Bob McElwee, Tony Lombardo
 Offensive Player of the Game: Raymond Philyaw (KC)
 Defensive Player of the Game: Kenny McEntyre (KC)
 Ironman of the Game: C. J. Johnson (NAS)

Scoring Summary:

1st Quarter:
13:55 – KC – 13 yd TD Pass to Gooch from Philyaw (PAT by Kral) – 7–0 KC
13:27 – NAS – 52 yd Kickoff Return TD by Johnson (PAT by Witczak) – 7–7
08:52 – NAS – 3 yd TD Run by Alexander (PAT by Witczak) – 14–7 NAS
05:22 – KC – 25 yd FG by Kral – 14–10 NAS
04:10 – KC – 33 yd Interception Return TD by McEntyre (PAT by Kral) – 17–14 KC

2nd Quarter:
12:49 – KC – 13 yd TD Pass to Frederick from Philyaw (PAT by Kral) – 24–14 KC
11:54 – NAS – 57 yd Kickoff Return TD by Johnson (Failed PAT by Witczak) – 24–20 KC
04:14 – KC – 1 yd TD Run by Frederick (Failed PAT by Kral) – 30–20 KC
00:45 – NAS – 4 yd TD Pass to Johnson from Kohn (PAT by Witczak) – 30–27 KC
00:10 – KC – 23 yd TD Pass to Myers from Philyaw (PAT by Kral) – 37–27 KC

3rd Quarter:
12:11 – NAS – 1 yd TD Run by Alexander (PAT by Witczak) – 37–34 KC
10:03 – KC – Safety by Dixon – 39–30 KC
08:16 – KC – 9 yd TD Pass to Myers from Philyaw (PAT by Kral) – 46–34 KC
02:20 – NAS – 3 yd TD Pass to Minucci from Kohn (PAT by Witczak) – 46–41 KC

4th Quarter:
10:08 – KC – 1 yd TD Run by Frederick (PAT by Kral) – 53–41 KC
07:30 – NAS – 11 yd TD Pass to Higgins from Kohn (PAT by Witczak) – 53–48 KC
05:26 – KC – 20 yd TD Pass to Hines from Philyaw (Failed PAT by Kral) – 59–48 KC
03:41 – NAS – 24 yd TD Pass to Johnson from Kohn (Rush Attempt by Elpheage) – 59–56 KC
02:41 – KC – 11 yd Kickoff Return TD by Smalls (PAT by Kral) – 66–56 KC
00:35 – NAS – 22 yd TD Pass to Johnson from Kohn (PAT by Witczak) – 66–63 KC
Attendance: 13,596
Offensive Player of the Game: Raymond Philyaw (KC)
Defensive Player of the Game: Kenny McEntyre (KC)
Ironman of the Game: C. J. Johnson (NAS)

Week 17: at Chicago Rush

at Allstate Arena, Rosemont, Illinois
 Game time: June 23, 2007 at 7:08 PM CDT
 Game attendance: 16,391
 Officials: Perry Havener, Tom Laverty, Bill Ward, David Meslow, Keith Washington, Marc Grossman
 Offensive Player of the Game: Matt D'Orazio (CHI)
 Defensive Player of the Game: DeJuan Alfonzo (CHI)

Scoring Summary:

1st Quarter:
11:15 – CHI – 7 yd TD Pass to Mager from D`Orazio (PAT by Frantz) – 7–0 CHI
08:22 – KC – 33 yd TD Pass to Myers from Philyaw (PAT by Kral) – 7–7
05:00 – CHI – 4 yd TD Pass to Sippio from D`Orazio (PAT by Frantz) – 14–7 CHI
02:15 – KC – 37 yd TD Pass to Hines from Philyaw (PAT by Kral) – 14–14

2nd Quarter:
11:39 – CHI – 3 yd TD Pass to Sippio from D`Orazio (PAT by Frantz) – 21–14 CHI
05:56 – KC – 1 yd TD Pass to Moore from Philyaw (PAT by Kral) – 21–21
00:55 – CHI – 7 yd TD Run by McMillen (PAT by Frantz) – 28–21 CHI

3rd Quarter:
09:30 – CHI – 4 yd TD Pass to Sippio from D`Orazio (PAT by Frantz) – 35–21 CHI
03:02 – CHI – 20 yd FG by Frantz – 38–21 CHI
00:00 – CHI – 47 yd Interception Return TD by Alfonzo (PAT by Frantz) – 45–21 CHI

4th Quarter:
03:18 – CHI – 21 yd FG by Frantz – 48–21 CHI

Playoffs

Round 1: vs (6) Colorado Crush

at Kemper Arena, Kansas City, Missouri
 Game time: June 30, 2007 at 2:00 PM CDT
 Game attendance: 9,539
 Officials: Dave Cutaia, Rick Olwe, Wayne Mackie, Dave Chesney, Jim Buchanan

Scoring Summary:

1st Quarter:
14:22 – COL – 38 yd TD Pass to Pyatt from Dutton (Failed PAT by Ball) – 6–0 COL
08:34 – COL – 1 yd TD Run by Thomas (PAT by Ball) – 13–0 COL
05:05 – KC – 7 yd TD Pass to Myers from Philyaw (PAT by Kral) – 13–7 COL
00:53 – COL – 19 yd FG by Ball – 16–7 COL

2nd Quarter:
12:51 – KC – 2 yd TD Run by Moss (PAT by Kral) – 16–14 COL
10:07 – COL – 5 yd TD Run by Kirsch (PAT by Ball) – 23–14 COL
07:12 – KC – 7 yd TD Pass to Hines from Philyaw (PAT by Kral) – 23–21 COL
03:18 – KC – 3 yd TD Pass to Hines from Philyaw (PAT by Kral) – 28–23 KC

3rd Quarter:
08:40 – COL – 21 yd TD Pass to Harrell from Dutton (PAT by Ball) – 30–28 COL

4th Quarter:
13:11 – COL – 4 yd TD Pass to Quinnie from Dutton (Failed PAT by Ball) – 36–28 COL
08:05 – KC – 6 yd TD Pass to Hines from Philyaw (PAT by Kral) – 36–35 COL
07:11 – COL – 4 yd TD Pass to Harrell from Dutton (Failed PAT by Ball) – 42–35 COL
04:57 – KC – 38 yd Interception Return TD by McEntyre (PAT by Kral) – 42–42
02:12 – COL – 4 yd TD Pass to Harrell from Dutton (PAT by Ball) – 49–42 COL

External links

Kansas City Brigade
Kansas City Command seasons